Scherk is a surname, and may refer to:

Heinrich Scherk (1798–1885), German mathematician
Joël Scherk (1946–1980), French physicist
Johann Theodor Scherk (1836–1923), politician in South Australia

Scherk is also a former cosmetics company in Germany founded by Ludwig Scherk, see Scherk (company)